The following is a list of awards and nominations received by George Lucas.

Major associations

Academy Awards

BAFTA Awards

Golden Globe Awards

Emmy Awards

Guild awards

Directors Guild of America Awards

Producers Guild of America Awards

Writers Guild of America Awards

Miscellaneous awards

Empire Awards

Evening Standard Film Awards

Hugo Awards

Saturn Awards

Other awards

References 

Awards
Lucas, George